USAV Major General Robert Smalls (LSV-8) is a General Frank S. Besson Jr.-class roll-on/roll-off of US Army.

Design 

Named in honor of Gen. Frank S. Besson Jr., former Chief of Transportation, U.S. Army, these ships have bow and stern ramps and the ability to beach themselves, giving them the ability to discharge 900 short tons of vehicles and cargo over the shore in as little as four feet of water, or 2,000 short tons as an intra-theater line haul roll-on/roll-off cargo ship. The vessel's cargo deck is designed to handle any vehicle in the US Army inventory and can carry up to 15 M1 Abrams main battle tanks or 82 ISO standard containers.

Construction and career 
She was acquired by the US Army on 21 June 2006 and commissioned on 15 September 2007 into the 605th Transportation Detachment, 8th Theater Sustainment Command.

References

External links 
 Navsource – Photo Gallery
 Frank S Besson Class LSV Logistic Support Vessel
 LSVs at globalsecurity.org
 Photo gallery: Family tour aboard the LSV-7 Kuroda | The Honolulu Advertiser
 LSV-8 USAV MG Roberts Smalls – a set on Flickr
 Army Commissions Vessel Named after African-American Civil War Hero, S.C. Statesman

Ships built in the United States
2007 ships
General Frank S. Besson-class support vessels